Evans may refer to:

People
Evans (surname)
List of people with surname Evans

Places

United States 
Evans Island, an island of Alaska
Evans, Colorado
Evans, Georgia
Evans County, Georgia
Evans, New York
Evans Mills, New York
Evans City, Pennsylvania
Evans, West Virginia

Elsewhere 
Évans, in France
Cape Evans, in Antarctica

Creeks
Evans Creek (Peters Creek), a tributary of Peters Creek in California
Evans Creek (Tuscarawas River), a stream in Ohio
Evans Creek (Devils River), a stream in Texas

Businesses and organizations
Robert B. Evans, founder of Evans Industries
Evans (retailer), of the United Kingdom
Evans Cycles, a United Kingdom bicycle retailer
Bob Evans Restaurants, a chain operated by Bob Evans Farms, Inc. of the United States
H. C. Evans, a defunct manufacturer of casino, amusement park and fairground equipment in the United States
D'Addario (manufacturer), a drumhead manufacturer also known as "Evans"

Transportation
Evans station (Muni Metro), a light rail station in San Francisco, California
Evans station (RTD), a light rail station in Denver, Colorado

Other
Chukwudi Onuamadike, a Nigerian generally known as Evans
 Early American Imprints, Series I: Evans, 1639–1800 (bibliographic collection)
Evans Gambit, a chess gambit
Evans Blue, a Canadian rock group
Evans syndrome, an autoimmune disease
Evans-Tibbs House, historic residence in Washington, D.C.

See also
Evan
Evans Lake (disambiguation)
Justice Evans (disambiguation)